The Karcher–Sahr House is a historic house located at 222 E. Prospect St. in Pierre, South Dakota. Built in 1910, the house was designed in the Classical Revival style. The house's design features a dentillated cornice with modillions and moldings, two-story Ionic columns supporting a pediment over the front entrance, and a front and side porch. The house's first owner, Henry Karcher, was an early settler and businessman in Pierre who also served as the city's mayor. After his daughter Marguerite married Fred Sahr, the couple lived in the house. Marguerite was a prominent activist for women's suffrage, and her son William was a state legislator.

The house was added to the National Register of Historic Places on September 22, 1977.

References

Houses on the National Register of Historic Places in South Dakota
Neoclassical architecture in South Dakota
Houses completed in 1910
Houses in Pierre, South Dakota
National Register of Historic Places in Pierre, South Dakota